Diop Tehuti Djed-Hotep Spence (born 9 August 2000) is an English professional footballer who plays as a right-back for Ligue 1 club Rennes, on loan from Premier League club Tottenham Hotspur.

Early life
Spence is the younger brother of actress Karla-Simone Spence. He was born in England and is of Jamaican descent.

Club career

Middlesbrough
Spence signed for Middlesbrough on 1 July 2018, having previously been with Fulham's academy. He made his debut for Middlesbrough in the EFL Cup on 14 August 2018, appearing as a substitute versus Notts County at the Riverside Stadium. Spence made his league debut for Middlesbrough in a 1–0 win over Charlton Athletic on 7 December 2019, scoring his first league goal in a 1–0 win against Huddersfield Town on 26 December 2019.

On 11 January 2020 Spence won EFL Young Player of The Month, following his league debut, first goal and three clean sheets.

Loan to Nottingham Forest
On 1 September 2021, it was announced Spence would join Nottingham Forest on loan for the remainder of the season. He scored his first goal for Forest in a 3-0 win over Birmingham City on 2 October. Spence impressed in FA Cup victories over Premier League clubs Arsenal and Leicester City, scoring the fourth in a 4–1 victory over the latter.

Spence was awarded the EFL Championship Player of the Month award for March 2022 as well as being nominated for the Goal of the Month award following his long range strike against Queens Park Rangers which he was ultimately awarded. Having also been nominated for the Championship Young Player of the Season, Spence made it a hat-trick of awards for March 2022 when he won the EFL Young Player of the Month award for the second time in his career.

Spence played a vital role in Nottingham Forest's promotion winning side, and was featured in both the EFL Championship Team of the Season and the PFA Championship team of the season.

Tottenham Hotspur

On 19 July 2022, Tottenham Hotspur announced the signing of Spence on a five-year deal, for a reported fee of £20 million. He made his Tottenham debut on 29 August, coming on as a late substitute in a 2-0 win against Nottingham Forest.

Loan to Rennes
On 31 January 2023, Spence joined Ligue 1 side Rennes on a loan until the end of the season.

International career
In March 2022, Spence earned a first international call up to the England Under-21 squad for the upcoming Under-21 European Championship Qualifying matches against Andorra and Albania. He made his debut as a substitute during a 3-0 victory away to the latter on 29 March 2022.

Style of play 
Spence primarily plays as a right-back, and is known for his pace and dribbling ability. He has been praised by the likes of Ian Wright, who described him as "combative, technical, swashbuckling", and Wes Morgan, who compared him to a Rolls-Royce.

Career statistics

Honours
Nottingham Forest
 EFL Championship play-offs: 2022

Individual
 EFL Young Player of the Month: December 2019, March 2022
 EFL Championship Player of the Month: March 2022
 EFL Championship Goal of the Month: March 2022
 EFL Championship Team of the Season: 2021–22
 PFA Team of the Year: 2021–22 Championship

References

External links
Profile at the Tottenham Hotspur F.C. website

Living people
2000 births
Association football fullbacks
Black British sportspeople
English footballers
English Football League players
English sportspeople of Jamaican descent
English people of Kenyan descent
Footballers from Greater London
Middlesbrough F.C. players
Nottingham Forest F.C. players
Tottenham Hotspur F.C. players
Stade Rennais F.C. players
Premier League players
Ligue 1 players
Expatriate footballers in France
English expatriate sportspeople in France